Roumeli may refer to:

 Rumelia, a historical term describing the area now referred to as the Balkans (Balkan Peninsula) when it was administered by the Ottoman Empire
 Central Greece or Roumeli, used since Ottoman times to refer to Central Greece, especially when juxtaposed with the Peloponnese or Morea
 Rumeli, used in some cases (mostly by Istanbul denizens) to refer exclusively to the part of Istanbul Province that is situated west of the Bosphorus